Barend Alkema is a South African former rugby league footballer who represented South Africa at the 1995 World Cup. He played in all three games in which they were involved.

References

Living people
South African rugby league players
South Africa national rugby league team players
Rugby league five-eighths
Rugby league halfbacks
Year of birth missing (living people)